The FIRS Men's Inline Hockey World Championships XIV is held in Germany between July 6 and July 12, 2008. It is the 14th such event hosted by the International Roller Sports Federation. Teams representing 17 countries will participate in four pools. The competition will also serve as qualifications for the 2009 competition as well as selection of the five top placing teams for the 2009 World Games.

Participating teams

Group 1

Pool A

Pool B

Group 2

Pool C

Pool D

Rules 
For standing purposes, points shall be awarded as follows:
 2 points for a win
 1 point for a tie
 No points for a loss

If teams are tied in a standing based on points, the following tie-breakers are applied:
1) The most points earned in direct games involving tied teams.
2) The best goal differential in direct games involving tied teams.
3) The most goal scored in direct games involving tied teams.
4) Follow steps 1, 2 and 3 with games involving the highest non-tied team in the same group.
5) Repeat step 4 with games involving the second highest non-tied team in the same group.
6) Continue this process with all non-tied team games.

Group 1
The top eight inline hockey nations were placed in the following two pools. After playing a round robin, the top three teams in each pool advance to the World Championship while the last team in each pool are relegated to the National Team World Cup.

Pool A

All times are local (UTC+2).

Pool B

All times are local (UTC+2).

Group 2
The remaining inline hockey nations were placed in the following two pools. After playing a round robin, the top team in each pool advance to the World Championship while the rest of the teams in each pool are relegated to the National Team World Cup.

Pool C

All times are local (UTC+2).

Pool D

All times are local (UTC+2).

World Championship

Draw

Quarterfinals
All times are local (UTC+2).

Semifinals
All times are local (UTC+2).

Bronze-medal game
All times are local (UTC+2)

Gold-medal game
All times are local (UTC-4)

5th-8th placement round

Draw

Qualifying round
All times are local (UTC+2).

7th-8th-place game
All times are local (UTC+2).

5th-6th-place game
All times are local (UTC+2).

National Team World Cup

Draw

Quarterfinals
All times are local (UTC+2).

Semifinals
All times are local (UTC+2).

Bronze-medal game
All times are local (UTC+2)

Gold-medal game
All times are local (UTC-4)

Placement Round Robin

All times are local (UTC+2).

Ranking and statistics

Tournament Awards
Best players selected by the FIRS:
Best Goalkeeper:
Best Defenseman:
Best Forward:
Most Valuable Player:
All-Tournament Team:
Goalkeeper:
Defense:
Forward:

Final standings
The final standings of the tournament according to FIRS:

Scoring leaders
List shows the top 10 skaters sorted by points, then goals. If the list exceeds 10 skaters because of a tie in points, all of the tied skaters are left out.
GP = Games played; G = Goals; A = Assists; Pts = Points; +/- = Plus/minus; PIM = Penalties in minutes; POS = Position

Leading goaltenders
Only the top 5 goaltenders, based on save percentage, who have played over 40% of their team's minutes are included in this list.
TOI = Time On Ice (minutes:seconds); SA = Shots against; GA = Goals against; GAA = Goals against average; Sv% = Save percentage; SO = Shutouts

See also 
 FIRS Inline Hockey World Championships
 List of FIRS Senior Men's Inline Hockey World Championships medalists

2008 in inline hockey
2008 in German sport
Inline hockey tournaments
International sports competitions hosted by Germany
Inline hockey in Germany